Sofian Bouvet (born 2 June 1989) is a French competitive sailor.

He competed at the 2016 Summer Olympics in Rio de Janeiro, in the men's 470.

References

External links 
 
 
 
 
 

1989 births
Living people
French male sailors (sport)
Olympic sailors of France
Sailors at the 2016 Summer Olympics – 470
21st-century French people